Ibo or IBO may refer to:

Places 
 Ibo, Mozambique, one of the Quirimbas Islands
 Ibo District, Hyōgo, a district of Hyōgo Prefecture in Japan
 Ibo River, a stream in Hyōgo Prefecture, Japan
 Igboland, the traditional lands of the Igbo people in the south-eastern region and surrounding states in Nigeria
 Aboh, a Nigerian city in Igboland also formerly known as "Ibo"

Acronyms 
 International Baccalaureate Organization, the former name of the International Baccalaureate
 International Biology Olympiad, an annual competition
 International Boxing Organization
 International Radio and Television Organisation (International Broadcasting Organization)
 Intellectual Property Business Organization
 Independent Business Owner

Other uses 
 Igbo people, an ethnic group of Nigeria
 Igbo language, a language of Nigeria
 İbrahim Tatlıses, a Kurdish pop-folk singer also known as "Ibo"
 Ibo Bonilla, a Costa Rican sculptor and architect

See also
 Igbo (disambiguation)